This article is an incomplete list of sporting events relevant to South Africa in 1962

Football (Rugby Union)
 South Africa national rugby union team wins three matches against the touring British Lions, and draw the fourth game

Golf
 Gary Player, wins the PGA Championship for the first time

Deaths
 28 April – Bennie Osler international rugby union player

See also
 Timeline of South African sport.

 
South Africa